Elections to Edinburgh Corporation were held on 3 May 1960, alongside municipal elections across Scotland. Of the councils 69 seats, 24 were up for election, including two seats in Murrayfield-Cramond ward. However only 15 wards in 14 seats were contested, as councillors were returned unopposed in nine wards.

No seats changed hands, and  Edinburgh Corporation remained composed of 39 Progressives, 28 Labour councillors, 1 Liberal, and 1 Protestant Action. The Progressives retained overall control of the council.

Turnout in the 14 contested wards was 67,270 or 32.1%.

Aggregate results

Ward Results

References

City of Edinburgh Council elections
Edinburgh